Daniel Edward Anderson (born January 1, 1951) is an American retired professional basketball player in the National Basketball Association (NBA).

Anderson was selected with the 2nd pick of the sixth round of the 1974 NBA Draft by the Portland Trail Blazers. His brief NBA career spanned from 1974 to 1976 with the Blazers, averaging 3.7 points in 95 total games. He was also selected in the 8th round of the 1974 ABA Draft by the San Diego Conquistadors.

Personal life
When he retired from the NBA, Anderson became a builder and a woodworker. His company grew to the point they were building over 100 homes every year. Anderson enjoys all manner of woodworking projects. He taught himself AutoCAD and specializes in building beautiful and unique furniture that employs a lot of curves.

References

External links
NBA stats @ Basketball-Reference.com

1951 births
Living people
American men's basketball players
Basketball players from Torrance, California
Point guards
Portland Trail Blazers draft picks
Portland Trail Blazers players
San Diego Conquistadors draft picks
USC Trojans men's basketball players